In enzymology, a nucleoside-triphosphate-aldose-1-phosphate nucleotidyltransferase is an enzyme that catalyzes the chemical reaction

nucleoside triphosphate + alpha-D-aldose 1-phosphate  diphosphate + NDP-hexose

Thus, the two substrates of this enzyme are nucleoside triphosphate and alpha-D-aldose 1-phosphate, whereas its two products are diphosphate and NDP-hexose.

This enzyme belongs to the family of transferases, specifically those transferring phosphorus-containing nucleotide groups (nucleotidyltransferases).  The systematic name of this enzyme class is NTP:alpha-D-aldose-1-phosphate nucleotidyltransferase. Other names in common use include NDP hexose pyrophosphorylase, hexose 1-phosphate nucleotidyltransferase, hexose nucleotidylating enzyme, nucleoside diphosphohexose pyrophosphorylase, hexose-1-phosphate guanylyltransferase, GTP:alpha-D-hexose-1-phosphate guanylyltransferase, GDP hexose pyrophosphorylase, guanosine diphosphohexose pyrophosphorylase, nucleoside-triphosphate-hexose-1-phosphate nucleotidyltransferase, and NTP:hexose-1-phosphate nucleotidyltransferase.

References

 
 

EC 2.7.7
Enzymes of unknown structure